Leucanopsis notodontina is a moth of the family Erebidae. It was described by Walter Rothschild in 1910. It is found in Peru.

References

notodontina
Moths described in 1910